Sir Jagadish Chandra Bose 
(30 November 1858 – 23 November 1937) was a polymath with interests in biology, physics, botany and writing science fiction. He was a pioneer in the investigation of radio microwave optics, made significant contributions to botany, and was a major force behind the expansion of experimental science on the Indian subcontinent. Bose is considered the father of Bengali science fiction. He invented the crescograph, a device for measuring the growth of plants. A crater on the moon was named in his honour. He founded Bose Institute, a premier research institute in India and also one of its oldest. Established in 1917, the institute was the first interdisciplinary research centre in Asia. He served as the Director of Bose Institute from its inception until his death.

Born in Munshiganj, Bengal Presidency, during British governance of India (now in Bangladesh), Bose graduated from St. Xavier's College, Calcutta (now Kolkata, West Bengal, India). He attended the University of London to study medicine, but had to give it up due to health problems. Instead, he conducted research with Nobel Laureate Lord Rayleigh at the University of Cambridge. Bose returned to India to join the Presidency College of the University of Calcutta as a professor of physics. There, despite racial discrimination and a lack of funding and equipment, Bose carried on his scientific research. He made progress in his research into radio waves in the microwave spectrum and was the first to use semiconductor junctions to detect radio waves.

Bose made pioneering discoveries in plant physiology. He used his own invention, the crescograph, to measure plant response to various stimuli and proved parallelism between animal and plant tissues. Bose filed for a patent for one of his inventions because of peer pressure, but he was generally critical of the patent system. To facilitate his research, he constructed automatic recorders capable of registering extremely slight movements; these instruments produced some striking results, such as quivering of injured plants, which Bose interpreted as a power of feeling in plants. His books include Response in the Living and Non-Living (1902) and The Nervous Mechanism of Plants (1926). He spent the last years of his life in Giridih. Here he lived in the house located near Jhanda Maidan. This building was named Jagdish Chandra Bose Smriti Vigyan Bhavan. It was inaugurated on 28 February 1997 by then Governor of Bihar AR Kidwai. In a 2004 BBC poll to name the Greatest Bengali of all time, Bose placed seventh.

Early life and education 

Jagadish Chandra Bose was born in a Bengali Kayastha family in Munsiganj (Bikrampur), Bengal Presidency (present-day Bangladesh) on 30 November 1858, to Bama Sundari Bose and Bhagawan Chandra Bose. His father was a leading member of the Brahmo Samaj and worked as a civil servant with the title Deputy Magistrate and Assistant Commissioner of Police (ACP)  in several places, including Faridpur and Bardhaman.

Bose's father sent Bose to a Bengali language school for his early education, as it was important to him that his son should study in his native language and culture before studying in English. Speaking at the Bikrampur Conference in 1915, Bose described the effect this early education had on him:

Bose joined the Hare School in Kolkata in 1869, followed by St. Xavier's School, also in Kolkata. In 1875, he passed the entrance examination of the University of Calcutta and was admitted to St. Xavier's College, Kolkata. There, he met Jesuit Father Eugene Lafont, who played a significant role in developing his interest in natural sciences. He received a BA from the University of Calcutta in 1879.

Bose wanted to follow his father into the Indian Civil Service, but his father forbid it, saying his son should be a scholar who would “rule nobody but himself.” Bose went to England to study medicine at the University of London, but had to quit because of allergies & ill health, possibly worsened by the chemicals used in the dissection rooms.

Through the recommendation of Anandamohan Bose, his brother-in-law and the first Indian Wrangler at the University of Cambridge, Bose secured admission in Christ's College, Cambridge to study natural sciences. In 1884 he received a BA (Natural Sciences Tripos) from the University of Cambridge as well as a BSc from the University College London affiliated under University of London in 1883.

Among Bose's teachers at Cambridge were Lord Rayleigh, Michael Foster, James Dewar, Francis Darwin, Francis Balfour, and Sidney Vines. While at Cambridge, he met University of Edinburgh student Prafulla Chandra Roy, with whom he became close friends. In 1887, Bose married feminist and social worker Abala Bose.

Professorship at Presidency College 

After obtaining a degree from the University of Cambridge Bose returned to India. Henry Fawcett had given Bose an introduction to Lord Ripon, the Viceroy of India, who recommended him for a post to the Director of Public Instruction in Kolkata. In those days such posts in the Imperial Education Service were usually reserved for Europeans.  Bose was appointed as an officiating professor of physics at Presidency College. Although the principal Charles Henry Tawney and Director of Education Alfred Woodley Croft were reluctant to appoint him, Bose took up his post in January of 1885.

At that time, an Indian professor was paid two thirds the salary of a European and since his appointment was considered temporary, his salary was further halved, making his salary one-third that of his European peers. As a protest, Bose did not accept his salary and worked without remuneration for the first three years at Presidency College.

He was popular among the students for his teaching style and demonstration of experiments. He got rid of the roll call. After three years’ work in this temporary post, the value of his professorial work was recognized by the principal Tawney and the director Croft, making Bose’s appointment permanent, with retrospective effect. Bose received his full pay for the last three years in a lump sum. But another source states that his appointment was made permanent on 21 September 1903, some 8 years after his joining the college.

Bose used his own money to fund his different research projects as well as receiving funding and support from the social activist nun Sister Nivedita.

Microwave radio research 

Bose became interested in radio following the 1894 publication of British physicist Oliver Lodge's demonstrations on how to transmit and detect radio waves. He began his own research in the new field in November 1894, setting up his equipment in small 20 ft sq room at Presidency College. Wanting to study the light-like properties of radio waves, hard to study using long radio waves, he managed to reduce the waves to the millimetre level (in the microwave range of about 5 mm wavelength).

Bose’s research was not initially appreciated by his department at the college. They felt he should focus only on teaching and that research involved neglect of his duties as a teacher, in spite of Bose giving 26 hours of weekly lectures. Later, when interest was generated in the wider scientific community, the Lieutenant-Governor of Bengal proposed a research post to help Bose. But this scheme was withdrawn when Bose voted against the government’s stance during a university meeting. The Lieutenant-Governor persevered to have a Rs.2500 annual grant issued. Despite this Bose found it hard to find time for research due to his teaching duties.

Bose submitted his first scientific paper, "On polarisation of electric rays by double-refracting crystals," to the Asiatic Society of Bengal in May 1895.  He submitted his second paper, "On a new electro-polariscope," to the Royal Society of London in October 1895, and it was published by The Electrician in December 1895. This may have been the first papers to be published by an Indian in western scientific periodicals. The paper described Bose's plans for a coherer, a term coined by Lodge referring to radio wave receivers, which he intended to "perfect" but never patented. The paper was well received by The Electrician and The Englishman, which in January 1896 (commenting on how this new type of wall and fog penetrating "invisible light" could be used in lighthouses) wrote:

In November 1895 at a public demonstration at the Town Hall of Kolkata, Bose showed how the millimetre range wavelength microwaves could travel through the human body (of Lieutenant Governor Sir William Mackenzie), and over a distance 23 metres through two intervening walls where they trigger apparatus he had set up to ring a bell and ignited gunpowder in a closed room.

Wanting to meet other scientists in Europe, Bose was given a six month scientific deputation in 1896. Bose went to London on a lecture tour and met Italian inventor Guglielmo Marconi, who had been developing a radio wave wireless telegraphy system for over a year and was trying to market it to the British post service. He was also congratulated by William Thomson, 1st Baron Kelvin and received an honorary Doctor of Science ( DSc) from the University of London. In an interview, Bose expressed his disinterest in commercial telegraphy and suggested others use his research work.

In 1899, Bose announced the development of an "iron-mercury-iron coherer with telephone detector" in a paper presented at the Royal Society, London.

Place in radio development 
Bose's work in radio microwave optics was specifically directed towards studying the nature of the phenomenon and was not an attempt to develop radio into a communication medium. His experiments took place during this same period (from late 1894 on) when Guglielmo Marconi was making breakthroughs on a radio system specifically designed for wireless telegraphy and others were finding practical applications for radio waves, such as Russian physicist Alexander Stepanovich Popov's radio wave based lightning detector, also inspired by Lodge's experiment. Although Bose's work was not related to communication he, like Lodge and other laboratory experimenters, probably had an influence on other inventors trying to develop radio as communications medium. Bose was not interested in patenting his work and openly revealed the operation of his galena crystal detector in his lectures. A friend in the US persuaded him to take out a US patent on his detector but he did not actively pursue it and allowed it to lapse."

Bose was the first to use a semiconductor junction to detect radio waves, and he invented various now-commonplace microwave components. In 1954, Pearson and Brattain gave priority to Bose for the use of a semi-conducting crystal as a detector of radio waves. In fact, further work at millimetre wavelengths was almost non-existent for the following 50 years. In 1897, Bose described to the Royal Institution in London his research carried out in Kolkata at millimetre wavelengths. He used waveguides, horn antennas, dielectric lenses, various polarisers and even semiconductors at frequencies as high as 60 GHz. Much of his original equipment is still in existence, especially at the Bose Institute in Kolkata. A 1.3 mm multi-beam receiver now in use on the NRAO 12  Metre Telescope, Arizona, US, incorporates concepts from his original 1897 papers.

Sir Nevill Mott, Nobel Laureate in 1977 for his own contributions to solid-state electronics, remarked that "J.C. Bose was at least 60 years ahead of his time. In fact, he had anticipated the existence of P-type and N-type semiconductors."

Plant research 

Bose conducted most of his studies in plant research on Mimosa pudica and Desmodium gyrans plants. His major contribution in the field of biophysics was the demonstration of the electrical nature of the conduction of various stimuli (e.g., wounds, chemical agents) in plants, which were earlier thought to be of a chemical nature. In order to understand the heliotropic movements of plants (the movement of a plant towards a light source), Bose invented a torsional recorder. He found that light applied to one side of the sunflower caused turgor to increase on the opposite side. These claims were later proven experimentally. He was also the first to study the action of microwaves in plant tissues and corresponding changes in the cell membrane potential. He researched the mechanism of the seasonal effect on plants, the effect of chemical inhibitors on plant stimuli and the effect of temperature.

Study of metal fatigue and cell response 

Bose performed a comparative study of the fatigue response of various metals and organic tissue in plants. He subjected metals to a combination of mechanical, thermal, chemical, and electrical stimuli and noted the similarities between metals and cells. Bose's experiments demonstrated a cyclical fatigue response in both stimulated cells and metals, as well as a distinctive cyclical fatigue and recovery response across multiple types of stimuli in both living cells and metals.

Bose documented a characteristic electrical response curve of plant cells to electrical stimulus, as well as the decrease and eventual absence of this response in plants treated with anaesthetics or poison. The response was also absent in zinc treated with oxalic acid. He noted a similarity in reduction of elasticity between cooled metal wires and organic cells, as well as an impact on the recovery cycle period of the metal.

Science fiction 

In 1896, Bose wrote Niruddesher Kahini (The Story of the Missing One), a short story that was later expanded and added to Abyakta (অব্যক্ত) collection in 1921 with the new title Palatak Tuphan (Runaway Cyclone). It was one of the first works of Bengali science fiction.

Bose Institute 

In 1917 Bose established the Bose Institute in Kolkata, West Bengal, India. Bose served as its Director for its first twenty years until his death. Today it is a public research institute of India and also one of its oldest. Bose in his inaugural address on 30 November 1917 dedicated the institute to the nation saying:

Personal views

Philosophical views 
As a child Bose was very impressed by the character of Karna, from Mahabharata. Talking about Karna, Bose said: He always played and fought fair! So his life, though a series of disappointments and defeats to the very end - his slaying by Arjuna - appealed to me as a boy as the greatest of triumphs. He identified Karna with the character of his father regarding whom he said: Always in struggle for the uplift of the people, yet with so little success, such frequent failures, that to most he seemed a failure. All this too gave me a lower and lower idea of all worldly success - how small its so-called victories are! - and higher and higher idea of conflict and defeat; and of true success born of defeat. In such ways I have come to feel one with the highest spirit of my race; with every fibre thrilling with the emotion of the past. That is its noblest teaching - that the only real and spiritual advantage is to fight fair, never to take crooked ways, but keep to the straight path, whatever be in the way.

Legacy and honors 

Bose's place in history has now been re-evaluated. His work may have contributed to the development of radio communication. He is also credited with discovering millimetre length electromagnetic waves and being a pioneer in the field of biophysics.

Many of his instruments are still on display and remain largely usable now, over 100 years later. They include various antennas, polarisers, and waveguides, which remain in use in modern forms today.

To commemorate his birth centenary in 1958, the JBNSTS scholarship programme was started in West Bengal. In the same year, India issued a postage stamp bearing his portrait. The same year Acharya Jagdish Chandra Bose, a documentary film directed by Pijush Bose, was released. It was produced by the Government of India's Films Division. Films Division also produced another documentary film, again titled Acharya Jagdish Chandra Bose, this time directed by the prominent Indian filmmaker Tapan Sinha.

On 14 September 2012, Bose's experimental work in millimetre-band radio was recognised as an IEEE Milestone in Electrical and Computer Engineering, the first such recognition of a discovery in India.

On 30 November 2016, Bose was celebrated in a Google Doodle on the 158th anniversary of his birth.

The Bank of England has decided to redesign the 50 UK Pound currency note with a prominent scientist. Jagadish Chandra Bose has been featured in that nomination list for his pioneering work on Wifi technology.

Honors
 Companion of the Order of the Indian Empire (CIE) – 1903 – in the 1903 Durbar Honours.
 Companion of the Order of the Star of India (CSI) – 1912
 Knight Bachelor (1917)
 Fellow of the Royal Society (FRS, 1920)
 Member of the Vienna Academy of Sciences, 1928
 President of the 14th session of the Indian Science Congress in 1927.
 Member of Finnish Society of Sciences and Letters in 1929.
 Member of the League of Nations' Committee for Intellectual Cooperation (from 1924 to 1931)
 Founding fellow of the National Institute of Sciences of India (now the Indian National Science Academy)

Legacy
 The J.C. Bose University of Science and Technology, YMCA, named in his honour.
 The Indian Botanic Garden was renamed in his honour as the Acharya Jagadish Chandra Bose Indian Botanic Garden on 25 June 2009.
 In 2004, Bose was ranked number 7 in BBC's poll of the Greatest Bengali of all time.

Publications 

Journals
 Nature published about 27 papers.
 
 

Books
 Response in the Living and Non-living, 1902
 Plant response as a means of physiological investigation, 1906
 Comparative Electro-physiology: A Physico-physiological Study, 1907
 Researches on Irritability of Plants, 1913
 Life Movements in Plants (vol.1), First Published 1918, Reprinted 1985
 Life Movements in Plants, Volume II, 1919
 Physiology of the Ascent of Sap, 1923
 The physiology of photosynthesis, 1924
 The Nervous Mechanism of Plants, 1926
 Plant Autographs and Their Revelations, 1927
 Growth and tropic movements of plants, 1929
 Motor mechanism of plants, 1928

Other
 J.C. Bose, Collected Physical Papers. New York, N.Y.: Longmans, Green and Co., 1927
 Abyakta (Bengali), 1922

Notes

References 
 .

Further reading 
 Ghosh, Kunal (2022). Unsung Genius : A Life of Jagadish Chandra Bose. India. Aleph Book Company.
 
 J.M. Payne & P.R. Jewell, "The Upgrade of the NRAO 8-beam Receiver," in Multi-feed Systems for Radio Telescopes, D.T. Emerson & J.M. Payne, Eds. San Francisco: ASP Conference Series, 1995, vol. 75, p. 144
 Fleming, J. A. (1908). The principles of electric wave telegraphy. London: New York and.
 
 Bose, Jagadish Chandra:  Runaway Cyclone (1921)  (science fiction book translated into English)

External links 

 Bose Institute website
 Jagadish Chandra Bose at the Encyclopædia Britannica
 
 
  (Project Gutenberg)
  (Project Gutenberg)
 J. C. Bose, The Unsung hero of radio communication , web.mit.edu
 JC Bose: 60 GHz in the 1890s
 Jagadish Chandra Bose at Engineering and Technology History Wiki
 ECIT Bose article at www.infinityfoundation.com
 Jagadish Chandra Bose materials in the South Asian American Digital Archive (SAADA)
 Entry on Bangla science fiction by Bodhisattva Chattopadhyay in The Science Fiction Encyclopedia
 

1858 births
1937 deaths
Alumni of Christ's College, Cambridge
Alumni of the University of London
Alumni of University College London
Bengali chemists
Bengali physicists
Bengali scientists
19th-century Indian physicists
20th-century Indian physicists
Brahmos
Das family of Telirbagh
Hare School alumni
Academic staff of Presidency University, Kolkata
Fellows of the Royal Society
Fellows of the Indian National Science Academy
Knights Bachelor
Companions of the Order of the Indian Empire
Companions of the Order of the Star of India
Indian Knights Bachelor
People from Mymensingh District
St. Xavier's College, Kolkata alumni
University of Calcutta alumni
Academic staff of the University of Calcutta
Bengali-language science fiction writers
People from Bikrampur
Scientists from Kolkata
History of radio
Radio pioneers
People from Munshiganj District
Bengali Hindus
People from Dhaka